Steindamm (German: "stone dam", "stone levee") may refer to:

Steindamm (Königsberg), a neighborhood in Königsberg (now Kaliningrad)
, a major street in Hamburg, Germany (:de:Steindamm)
Steindamm, a station on the Wangerooge Island Railway, the East Frisian island of Wangerooge off the northwestern coast of Germany